The 2014 Virginia Tech Hokies baseball team is representing Virginia Tech in the 2014 NCAA Division I baseball season.   Head Coach Patrick Mason is in his 1st year coaching the Hokies. They are coming off a 2013 season, in which they had a 40 win season.  15 of them came in the ACC.  That marked the fifth straight year with over 30 wins.

Personnel

Schedule 

! style="background:#ff6600;color:#660000;"| Regular Season
|- valign="top" 

|- align="center" bgcolor="#ffbbb"
| February 14 || The Citadel || – || Joseph P. Riley Jr. Park || 2-6 || J. Reeves(1-0)|| T. McIntyre(0-1) || None || 520 || 0-1 || –
|- bgcolor="#ccffcc"
| February 15 || Delaware || – || Joseph P. Riley Jr. Park || 8-1 || B. Markey(1-0)|| A. Davis(0-1) || None|| 214 || 1-1 || –
|- align="center" bgcolor="#ffbbb"
| February 21 || at #5  || – || Alex Box Stadium/Skip Bertman Field || 0-9 || Nola(2-0)|| B. Markey(1-1) || None || 11,417 || 1-2 || –
|- bgcolor="#ccffcc"
| February 22 ||  || – || Alex Box Stadium/Skip Bertman Field || 8-2 || K. Scheetz(1-0)|| Gomez(0-1) || A. McGarity(1)|| 285 || 2-2 || –
|- bgcolor="#CCCCCC"
| February 23 ||  || – || Alex Box Stadium/Skip Bertman Field ||colspan=7|Cancelled due to weather
|- bgcolor="#ccffcc"
| February 25 ||  || – || English Field || 6-1 || L. Collazo(1-0) || Austin (0-2) || None || 186 || 3-2 || –
|- bgcolor="#ccffcc"
| February 28 ||  || – || English Field || 4-1 || B. Markey(2-1) || M. Ring(1-1) || L. Scherzer(1) || 342 || 4-2 || –
|-

|- bgcolor="#ccffcc"
| March 1 ||  || - || English Field  || 4-3 || T. McIntyre(1-1) || N. Boutoures(0-1) || None || 582 || 5-2 || –
|- align="center" bgcolor="#ffbbb"
| March 2 || UMass-Lowell || - || English Field || 4-6 || T. Denaro(2-0) || L. Scherzer(0-1) || S. Xirinachs(2) || 611 || 5-3 || –
|- bgcolor="#ccffcc"
| March 2 || Cincinnati || - || English Field  || 9-6 || Kennedy(1-0) || C. Walsh(1-1) || None || 476 || 6-3 || –
|- align="center" bgcolor="#ffbbb"
| March 5 || William & Mary || - || English Field  || 0-7 || N. Brown(2-0) || M. Tulley(0-1) || None || 345 || 6-4 || –
|- align="center" bgcolor="#ffbbb"
| March 7 || at #15 Clemson* || - || Doug Kingsmore Stadium  || 6-7 || M. Campbell(2-0) || B. Markey(0-1) || None || 3,175 || 6-5 || 0–1
|- align="center" bgcolor="#ffbbb"
| March 8 || at #15 Clemson* || - || Doug Kingsmore Stadium  || 2-12 || M. Crownover(3-1) || K. Scheetz(1-1) || None || 5,481 || 6-6 || 0-2
|- align="center" bgcolor="#ffbbb"
| March 9 || at #15 Clemson* || - || Doug Kingsmore Stadium  || 4-11 || C. Schmidt(2-2) || T.McIntyre(1-2) || None || 4,556 || 6-7 || 0-3
|- align="center" bgcolor=""
| March 11 || at  || - || Malcolm U. Pitt Field || 10-10 || - || - || - || 408 || 6-7-1 || 0–3
|- align="center" bgcolor="#ffbbb"
| March 12 || VCU || - || English Field  || 14-21 || M. Lees(2-1) || P. Sciretta(0-1) || T. Gill(2) || 192 || 6-8-1 || 0–3
|- bgcolor="#ccffcc"
| March 14 || * || - || English Field  || 11-5 || T. McIntyre (2-2) || H. Harris(2-2) || None || 768 || 7-8-1 || 1–3
|- bgcolor="#ccffcc"
| March 15 || Pittsburgh* || - || English Field  || 11-10 || L. Scherzer(1-1) || H. Harris(2-3) || None || 981 || 8-8-1 || 2–3
|- bgcolor="#ccffcc"
| March 15 || Pittsburgh* || - || English Field  || 11-7 || P. Sciretta (1-1) || M. Wotherspoon(2-3) || S. Kennedy(1) || 522 || 9-8-1 || 3–3
|- bgcolor="#ccffcc"
| March 19 ||  || - || English Field  || 6-3 || P. Sciretta(2-1) || K. Baxter(0-3) || L. Scherzer(2) || 371 || 10-8-1 || 3–3
|- align="center" bgcolor="#ffbbb"
| March 21 || at * || - || Frank Eck Stadium || 1-2 || S. Fitzgerald(3-1) || B. Markey(2-3) || None || 253 || 10-9-1 || 3–4
|- align="center" bgcolor="#cffcc"
| March 22 || at Notre Dame* || - || Frank Eck Stadium  || 8-3 || S. Keselica(2-0) || N. McCarty(0-5) || L.Scherzer(3) || 681 || 11-9-1 || 4–4
|- bgcolor="#ccffcc"
| March 23 || at Notre Dame* || - || Frank Eck Stadium  || 5-4 || L. Scherzer (2-1) || M. Hearne (1-2) || S. Kennedy(2) || 422 || 12-9-1|| 5–4
|- align="center" bgcolor="#ffbbb"
| March 28 || at #1 Virginia* || - || Davenport Field  || 1-2 || W. Mayberry(2-1) || B. Markey(2-4) || N. Howard(7) || 3,414 || 12-10-1 || 5–5
|- align="center" bgcolor="#ffbbb"
| March 29 || at #1 Virginia* || - || Davenport Field  || 2-9 || C. Jones(4-0) || S. Keselica(2-1) || None || 3,587 || 12-11-1 || 5–6
|- align="center" bgcolor="#ffbbb"
| March 30 || at #1 Virginia* || - || Davenport Field  || 4-7 || W. Mayberry(3-1) || S. Kennedy(1-1) || N. Howard(8) || 2,500 || 12-12-1 || 5–7
|-

|- bgcolor="#ccffcc"
|April 1 ||  || - || English Field || 11-5 || J. Doran(1-0) || Gunst(1-4) || None || 1,672 || 13-12-1 || 5-7
|- bgcolor="#ccffcc"
|April 2 || Radford || - || English Field ||  8-5 || K. Scheetz(2-1) || COSTELLO(2-1) || L. Scherzer(4) || 1,067 || 14-12-1 || 5–7
|- align="center" bgcolor="#ffbbb"
|April 4 || #24 * || - || English Field || 7-8 || Hammond(4-0) || A. Perez(0-1) || Garcia(8) || 1,045 || 14-13-1 || 5-8
|- align="center" bgcolor="#ffbbb"
|April 5 || #24 Miami* || - || English Field || 3-4 || Suarez(4-1)  || S. Keselica(2-2) || Garcia(9) || 1,468 || 14-14-1 || 5-9
|- align="center" bgcolor="#ffbbb"
|April 6 || #24 Miami* || - || English Field || 2-9 || Radziewski(2-2) || L. Woodcock(0-1) || None || 1,083 || 14-15-1 || 5-10
|- align="center" bgcolor="#ffbbb"
|April 8 || at VCU || - ||The Diamond (Richmond, Virginia) || 6-11 || Lees(5-2) || S. Kennedy(1-2) || None || 8226 || 14-16-1 || 5-10
|- bgcolor="#ccffcc"
|April 9 || Longwood || - || English Field || 4-1 || A. Perez(1-1)|| Simpson(1-2) || A. McDonald(1) || 164 || 15-16-1 || 5-10
|- bgcolor="#ccffcc"
|April 11 || Maryland* || - || English Field || 3-1 || S. Keselica(3-2) || Stinnett(3-5) || B. Markey(1) || 1,583 || 16-16-1 || 6-10
|- align="center" bgcolor="#ffbbb"
|April 12 || Maryland* || - || English Field || 2-4 || M. Shawaryn(6-2) || A. McGarity(0-1) || Mooney(6) || 1,542 || 16-17-1 || 6-11
|- bgcolor="#ccffcc"
|April 13 || Maryland* || - || English Field || 6-4 || J. Woodcock(1-1)  || Ruse(4-1) || T. McIntyre(1) || 1,136 || 17-17-1|| 7-11
|- bgcolor="#ccffcc"
|April 14 || at #30 Liberty || - || Liberty Baseball Stadium || 4-3 || K. Scheetz(3-1) || Lyons(2-2) || L. Scherzer(5) || 2,702 || 18-17-1 || 7-11
|- align="center" bgcolor="#ffbbb"
|April 18 || * || - || English Field || 2-3 || Hendrix(2-1)  || B. Markey(2-5) || None || 946 || 18-18-1 || 7-12
|- align="center" bgcolor="#ffbbb"
|April 19 || Duke* || - || English Field || 3-13 || Swart(3-1) || A. McGarity(0-2) || None || 1,925 || 18-19-1 || 7-13
|- align="center" bgcolor="#ffbbb"
|April 20 || Duke* || - || English Field || 0-2 || Matuella(1-1)  || J. Woodcock(1-2) || Huber(7) || 951 || 18-20-1 || 7-14
|- align="center" bgcolor="#ffbbb"
|April 22 ||  || - || English Field || 0-11 || Mason(1-1) || A. Perez(1-2) || None || 285 || 18-21-1 || 7-14
|- align="center" bgcolor="#ffbbb"
|April 23 || Campbell || - || English Field || 9-14 || Darcy(1-0) || A. McGarity(0-3) || None || 316 || 18-22-1 || 7-14
|- align="center" bgcolor="#ffbbb"
|April 25 || at * || - || Boshamer Stadium || 2-3 || Kelley(1-1) || S. Keselica(3-3) || Hovis(5) || 1,328 || 18-23-1 || 7-15
|- align="center" bgcolor="#ffbbb"
|April 26 || North Carolina* || - || Boshamer Stadium || 4-6 || Moss(3-2) || B. Markey(2-6) || Hovis(6) || 3,720 || 18-24-1 || 7-16
|- align="center" bgcolor="#ffbbb"
|April 27 || North Carolina* || - || Boshamer Stadium || 4-5 || Hovis(6-1) || Scherzer(2-2) || None || 2,770 || 18-25-1 || 7-17
|- align="center" bgcolor=""
|April 29 || at Radford || - || Radford Baseball Stadium || -|| - || - || - || - || - || -
|-

|- align="center" bgcolor=""
| May 2 || at * || - || Russ Chandler Stadium || - || - || - || - || - || - || -
|- align="center" bgcolor=""
| May 3 || at Georgia Tech* || - || Russ Chandler Stadium || - || - || - || - || - || - || -
|- align="center" bgcolor=""
| May 4 || at Georgia Tech* || - || Russ Chandler Stadium || - || - || - || - || - || - || -
|- align="center" bgcolor=""
| May 6 ||  || - || H. P. Hunnicutt Field || - || - || - || - || - || - || -
|- align="center" bgcolor=""
| May 7 ||  || - || English Field || - || - || - || - || - || - || -
|- align="center" bgcolor=""
| May 13 || William & Mary || - || English Field || - || - || - || - || - || - || -
|- align="center" bgcolor=""
| May 15 || * || - || English Field || - || - || - || - || - || - || -
|- align="center" bgcolor=""
| May 16 || NC State* || - || English Field || - || - || - || - || - || - || -
|- align="center" bgcolor=""
| May 17 || NC State* || - || English Field || - || - || - || - || - || - || -
|-

|-
! style="background:#ff6600;color:#660000;"| Post-Season
|- 

|- align="center" bgcolor=""
| May 20 || - || – || UNCG Baseball Stadium || - || - || - || - || - || -
|- align="center" bgcolor=""
| May 21 || - || – || UNCG Baseball Stadium || - || - || - || - || - || -
|- align="center" bgcolor=""
| May 22 || - || – || UNCG Baseball Stadium || - || - || - || - || - || -
|- align="center" bgcolor=""
| May 23 || - || – || UNCG Baseball Stadium || - || - || - || - || - || -
|- align="center" bgcolor=""
| May 24 || - || – || UNCG Baseball Stadium || - || - || - || - || - || -
|- align="center" bgcolor=""
| May 25 || - || – || UNCG Baseball Stadium || - || - || - || - || - || -
|-

|-
| style="font-size:88%" | Rankings from USA TODAY/ESPN Top 25 coaches' baseball poll. Parenthesis indicate tournament seedings.
|-
| style="font-size:88%" | *ACC Conference games

See also 
 Virginia Tech Hokies
 2014 NCAA Division I baseball season

References 

Virginia Tech Hokies
Virginia Tech Hokies baseball seasons
Virginia Tech Hokies baseball